Salesiano Valparaíso is a primary and secondary Salesian school. It is located in Valparaíso, Chile.

References

External links
Official website (en español)

Salesian schools
Education in Chile
Salesian secondary schools